Guy Croxford (born 2 June 1981) is a Zimbabwean cricketer. He played thirteen first-class matches between 2000 and 2003.

See also
 CFX Academy cricket team

References

External links
 

1981 births
Living people
Zimbabwean cricketers
CFX Academy cricketers
Manicaland cricketers
Sportspeople from Harare